The 2003 Hamburg Masters doubles was a German tennis event.

Mahesh Bhupathi and Jan-Michael Gambill were the defending champions but they competed with different partners that year, Bhupathi with Max Mirnyi and Gambill with Graydon Oliver.

Gambill and Oliver lost in the first round to Gustavo Kuerten and Tim Henman.

Bhupathi and Mirnyi lost in the final 6–4, 7–6(12–10) against Mark Knowles and Daniel Nestor.

Seeds
Champion seeds are indicated in bold text while text in italics indicates the round in which those seeds were eliminated. All eight seeded teams received byes to the second round.

Draw

Final

Top half

Bottom half

External links
 2003 Hamburg Masters Doubles Draw

2003 ATP Tour